is a train station on the Osaka Metro Imazatosuji Line in Sekime Gochome, Joto-ku, Osaka, Japan.

While situated relatively close to Sekime-Takadono on the Tanimachi Line, there are no free transfers between the two stations.

Lines
Osaka Metro Imazatosuji Line (Station Number: I17)
Keihan Electric Railway Keihan Main Line (Sekime Station)

Layout
This station has 2 split platforms serving a track each. Each platform is fenced with platform gates.

References

Jōtō-ku, Osaka
Railway stations in Osaka
Osaka Metro stations
Railway stations in Japan opened in 2006